Gregg Allan Boddy (born March 19, 1949) is a Canadian former professional ice hockey defenceman who spent five seasons with the Vancouver Canucks of the National Hockey League between 1971 and 1976. He also played briefly in the World Hockey Association for the San Diego Mariners and Edmonton Oilers. Boddy would conclude his hockey career with two seasons in the Japan Ice Hockey League, retiring in 1979.

Playing career
After a junior career with the Edmonton Oil Kings, Boddy was selected 27th overall in the 1969 NHL Amateur Draft by the Los Angeles Kings. He spent one season in the minors in the Kings' system before being dealt to the Montreal Canadiens in a six-player trade in 1970. On a deep Montreal team, he was similarly stuck in the AHL, and was dealt to the Vancouver Canucks for a draft pick in 1971.

Boddy made his NHL debut in 1971–72, as he was called up mid-season from the Rochester Americans, and made a positive impression with his reliable defensive play. He finished the year with 2 goals and 7 points in 40 games, and established himself as a regular on the Canucks' blueline. In 1972–73, he appeared in 74 games for the Canucks, posting 3 goals and 11 assists for 14 points.

1973–74 would prove to be a disappointment, as he appeared in only 53 games and was briefly reassigned to the minors. However, he bounced back strongly in 1974–75 to have his best season as Vancouver won their division and made the playoffs for the first time in their history. Boddy finished the season with a career-high 11 goals, which was an individual feat for the usually stay-at-home Boddy who had scored a total of 16 goals in the previous eight seasons combined dating back to junior. He also contributed 12 assists for a total of 23 points, along with 56 penalty minutes as he saw the only NHL playoff action of his career, appearing in 3 games as the Canucks were knocked out early.

However, Boddy's career would stall in 1975–76, as he lost his regular place on the Canucks' blueline and was reassigned to the minors. He jumped to the rival WHA for the 1976–77 season, joining the San Diego Mariners, but after a month in San Diego he was dealt to his hometown Edmonton Oilers, finishing the year with 2 goals and 19 assists for 21 points in 64 games.

Boddy spent two more seasons playing in the Japan Ice Hockey League for Oji Seishi before retiring in 1979. He finished his career with totals of 23 goals and 44 assists for 67 points in 273 NHL games, along with 263 penalty minutes.

Career statistics

Regular season and playoffs

References

External links

1949 births
Living people
Canadian ice hockey defencemen
Edmonton Oil Kings (WCHL) players
Edmonton Oilers (WHA) players
Ice hockey people from Alberta
Los Angeles Kings draft picks
Montreal Voyageurs players
Oji Eagles players
People from Ponoka, Alberta
Rochester Americans players
San Diego Mariners players
Seattle Totems (WHL) players
Springfield Kings players
Tulsa Oilers (1964–1984) players
Vancouver Canucks players